Scotch Hill is a community in Clarion County, Pennsylvania, United States. It was founded in the 19th century by James J. Scotch and William F. Hill.

Per the History of Clarion County PA Edited by A.J. Davis:"In 1836 George Alsbach, a native of Union county, purchased the Anderson tract for $1,500, and removed to it with his family from Shippenville. The surrounding country north, east, and south was a howling wilderness. Mr.Alsbach soon replaced the two log cabins, and the half barn of the same material, " which required props to keep it from falling," by more comfortable and modern frame dwellings. In the spring of 185 1 Mr. Alsbach laid out a portion of his farm in lots and called the prospective village Scotch Hill, to commemorate its former occupant, Anderson, and his neighbor, McNaughton.

References

Unincorporated communities in Pennsylvania
Unincorporated communities in Clarion County, Pennsylvania
Scotch-Irish American culture in Pennsylvania